Ivan Joller (born 24 April 1983) is a former Swiss biathlete. He competed at the Biathlon World Championships 2012 in Ruhpolding and at the Biathlon World Championships 2013 in Nove Mesto na Morave. He competed at the 2014 Winter Olympics in Sochi, in the individual contest.

References

External links

1983 births
Living people
Biathletes at the 2014 Winter Olympics
Swiss male biathletes
Olympic biathletes of Switzerland